"The Holding" is the eleventh episode of the sixth season of the post-apocalyptic horror television series Fear the Walking Dead, the 80th episode overall,  "The Holding" was released on the streaming platform AMC+ on April 31, 2021, in the United States and aired on television on AMC two days later, on May 2, 2021.

An infiltration into the underground bunker unexpectedly turns into a rescue mission as the members of the group dig deeper into an underground community and their plans for the future.

Plot 
Alicia (Alycia Debnam-Carey), Althea (Maggie Grace), Luciana (Danay García), and Wes (Colby Hollman) pose as new recruits to infiltrate an underground settlement called "The Holding," where workers turn walkers into dirt to farm and grow food. They look at a wall where the message "THE END IS THE BEGINNING" is written.

After being greeted by a worker named Riley (Nick Stahl), they are questioned to provide information to the group's leader, Teddy (John Glover). Later, a group of people arrive, including Wes's brother Derek, whom Wes thought had long since died. Wes tries to get information from Derek, but Derek claims that Wes "isn't ready yet." While Derek is gone, Wes and Althea search Derek's room and find maps of the local settlements, including Tank Town and Lawton, as well as the whereabouts of Isabelle's group. Wes confronts Derek about why his group is attacking settlements; Derek explains that the only way the world can start over is by destroying everything and everyone on the surface.

The group tries to escape and take Derek with them, but they are caught by Riley, who leads them to an embalming room. He offers to spare their lives if they reveal Morgan's location. They all refuse, but Derek gets Riley's permission to try to show Wes "the truth." Derek leads Wes to a walker shown, and Wes realizes that Derek knew he was in Tank Town during the attack. A fight ensues. Wes overpowers Derek and slams him against the walker.

The walker bites Derek, killing him. Wes returns to his friends and holds Riley at gunpoint, they flee into a room full of embalmed walkers; Alicia opens several to release the embalming fluid and sets the complex on fire while the others escape back to the dam settlement. Morgan promises to rescue Alicia. Back at the Holding, Alicia kills a cultist who attempts to embalm her and meets Teddy, who is upset that she destroyed everything that he was working for, but admits that he has been looking for someone like her for a long time.

Reception

Critical reception 
David S.E. Zapanta from Den of Geek! rated the episode 4.5 out of 5 and wrote: "It’s not until we meet Teddy in the flesh that “The Holding” goes from a good episode to a great one [...] John Glover commands the screen the moment he appears, looking every bit like the charismatic leader of a doomsday cult." Paul Daily of TV Fanatic praised the episode as "an action-packed, tension-filled delight". Emily Hannemann of TV Insider gave the episode 4 out of 5 stars, saying "I'm interested to see where Alicia's story goes from here." Ray Flook of Bleeding Cool wrote, "And that's what I loved about "The Holding"- questions brought answers that brought more questions, leaving us feeling both satisfied and counting down the days until the next chapter." Erik Kain of Forbes was not impressed with the latests villains but expressed hope for Teddy.

Ratings 
The episode was seen by 1.03 million viewers in the United States on its original air date, below the previous episodes.

References

External links

 "The Holding" at AMC.com
 

2021 American television episodes
Fear the Walking Dead (season 6) episodes